Cesare Bermani (born Novara, 6 May 1937) is an Italian author and historian.

Son of the socialist politician Alessandro Bermani, he was one of the founders of the Ernesto de Martino Institute.

He now lives in Orta San Giulio, Piedmont.

Select bibliography
 Il bambino e servito: Leggende metropolitane in Italia (Prisma, 1991) 
 Spegni la luce che passa Pippo: Voci, leggende e miti della storia contemporanea (1996) 
 Storia e mito della Volante rossa (I nostri/documenti) (1996) 
 Al lavoro nella Germania di Hitler: Racconti e memorie dell'emigrazione italiana, 1937-1945 (Nuova cultura, 1998) 
  Il nemico interno. Guerra civile e lotte di classe in Italia (1943-1976) (2003)
  Introduzione alla storia orale 
  Giornali di classe. La scuola a Taranto dal fascismo al dopoguerra
  Una storia cantata. 1962-1997
  Giovanni Pirelli: un autentico rivoluzionario
  Pane, rose e libertà. Le canzoni che hanno fatto l'Italia: 150 anni di musica popolare, sociale e di protesta (Rizzoli, 2010)
  Volare al sabba. Una ricerca sulla stregoneria popolare
  Guerra guerra ai palazzi e alle chiese... Saggi sul canto sociale 
  I dischi del sole: una storia della piu importante etichetta discografica
  La volante rossa. Storia e mito di «un gruppo di bravi ragazzi»

References

1937 births
Living people
20th-century Italian historians
Writers from Piedmont